The Non-Academic Staff Union of Educational and Associated Institutions (NASU) is a trade union representing academic workers, other than teachers and lecturers, in Nigeria.

The union was founded in 1978, when the Government of Nigeria merged the following unions:

 University of Ibadan and Allied Institutions Workers' Union
 University College Hospital Workers' Union
 West African Examinations Council Workers' Union
 Cocoa Research Institute of Nigeria General Workers' Union
 Eastern Nigeria Library Staff Union
 University of Nigeria Workers' Union
 University of Ife Workers' Union
 Agricultural Research Workers' Union of Nigeria
 University of Lagos Workers' Union
 Nigerian Institute for Oil Palm Research Workers' Union
 University Teaching Hospital School of Medicine Workers' Union
 Yaba College of Technblogy Workers' Union of Nigeria
 School of Careers (Nigeria) Workers' Union
 Nigerian Union of Non-Teaching Staff
 Ahmadu Bello University Workers' Union
 Clerks and Bursars Union of Secondary and Training Colleges Western Nigeria
 Nigerian Institute for Rubber Research Workers' Union, Mid-West
 East-Central State Union of Education Non-Tutorial Employees
 Nigerian Institute for Trypasonomiasis Research Workers' Union
 Western State Schools and Colleges General Workers' Union
 Non-Tutorial Staff Association of Educational Institutions of East-Central State
 Kainji Lake Research Project and Allied Workers' Union
 Secondary Schools Non-Teaching Staff Workers' Union
 National Library and Allied Institutions Workers Union of Nigeria
 University of Benin Workers' Union
 Ibadan Polytechnic Workers' Union
 University of Benin Teaching Hospital Workers' Union
 Union of Administrative Staff of Mid-West Colleges
 Institute of Management and Technology Workers Union East-Central State of Nigeria
 British Council Staff Union
 College of Science and Technology Workers' Union
 Auchi Polytechnic Workers' Union
 University of Nigeria Teaching Hospital Workers' Union

The union affiliated to the Nigeria Labour Congress.  It had 260,000 members in both 1988 and 1995.

References

Education trade unions
Trade unions established in 1978
Trade unions in Nigeria